Georgij Karlowich Kreyer (Georgy Karlovich Kreyer) (November 26, 1887 – January 11, 1942) was a Russian Empire and Soviet botanist and mycologist (lichenologist) born in Saint Petersburg.<ref name=obit>Science, "Deaths or Russian Botanists,  16 Feb 1945: Vol. 101, Issue 2616, pp. 166-167  p. 167</ref>

In academic publications, his name has been spelt variously Georgij Kalowic Kreyer, Georgij Karlowich Kreyer and (in Polish orthography) Georgij Karlowicz Kreyer. 
Between 1908 and 1910, he made extensive collections of lichens in the Mogilev Region of Belarus, between Orsha and Syanno, in the neighbourhood of the settlements of Smalyany, Bobromynichi (Vitebsk Region) and Selets.

 Examples of names published Atropa caucasica Kreyer. (species now demoted to Atropa belladonna ssp. caucasica (Kreyer) Avet.) Kreyer is commemorated in the name of the plant species Valeriana kreyeriana Sumnev. in the genus Valeriana.

Kreyer was the editor of the 1913 work on fungi Mycota'' (180 pages) reissued in 1915. This includes descriptions of the morphology of 190 species, many of which go into some detail concerning intraspecific variability and feature discussions of the differences between taxa linked by virtue of their morphology.

References

1887 births
1942 deaths

Scientists from Saint Petersburg
Lichenologists from the Russian Empire
Soviet botanists
Victims of the Siege of Leningrad
Soviet mycologists